Aryna Sabalenka was the defending champion, but lost in the second round to Kristýna Plíšková.

Ekaterina Alexandrova won her first WTA singles title, defeating Elena Rybakina in the final, 6–2, 6–4.

Seeds

Draw

Finals

Top half

Bottom half

Qualifying

Seeds

Qualifiers

Qualifying draw

First qualifier

Second qualifier

Third qualifier

Fourth qualifier

References

External Links
Main Draw
Qualifying Draw

2020 Singles
WTA Shenzhen Open - Singles